Piotr Madejski (born 2 August 1983 in Kraków) is a Polish footballer (midfielder) who plays for Wieczysta Kraków.

Career

Club

In July 2011, he joined Miedź Legnica.

References

External links
 

1983 births
Living people
Górnik Zabrze players
Polish footballers
Arka Gdynia players
Hutnik Nowa Huta players
Kolejarz Stróże players
Miedź Legnica players
Footballers from Kraków
Association football midfielders
Poland international footballers